The Shire of Boddington is a local government area in the Peel region of Western Australia, about  south-east of the state capital, Perth.

History
The Mooradung Road District was established on 19 May 1892. It was renamed the Marradong Road District on 30 October 1903.

The board initially convened at Marradong 8 km to the south of Boddington, but relocated to Boddington in 1925 after the arrival of the railway and construction of suitable buildings. On 1 July 1961, the Marradong Road District became the Shire of Boddington following the passage of the Local Government Act 1960, which reformed all remaining road districts into shires.

Wards
The Shire has been divided into 2 wards.

 Town Ward (4 councillors)
 Rural Ward (3 councillors)

Towns and localities
The towns and localities of the Shire of Boddington with population and size figures based on the most recent Australian census:

* Indicates locality is only partially located within the Shire of Boddington

Population

Heritage-listed places

As of 2023, 61 places are heritage-listed in the Shire of Boddington, of which one is listed on the State Register of Heritage Places, Asquith Bridge, which was completely destroyed in the bush fire in 2015.

References

External links
 

 
Boddington